The siege of Gurdaspur was a major campaign of the new Mughal Emperor Farrukhsiyar in present-day India in 1715.

Aftermath
Banda and his followers were captured alive and then taken to Delhi and executed under the orders of Mughal Emperor Farrukhsiyar in the year 1716, along with a large number of Sikhs who were rounded up by the Mughal army from villages and towns on the march back to Delhi.

See also
Mughal Empire

References

Gurdaspur
Gurdaspur
1715 in Asia
1715 in India